Blaubeuren Abbey was a Benedictine monastery until the Reformation, located in Blaubeuren, Baden-Württemberg, Germany. It is now a Protestant seminary.

History: Catholic
The monastery was founded in 1085 by the Counts of Tübingen and their vassal Sigiboto von Ruck, against the background of the Investiture Controversy and the Hirsau Reforms. The first abbot, Adzelinus, and monks were from Hirsau Abbey.

Abbot Fabri was closely involved with the foundation of the University of Tübingen in 1477. In 1493 the high altar was created. The choir stalls by Jörg Syrlin the Younger are of a similar date.

The Reformation saw the end of the Catholic monastery, from which the monks were expelled in 1535, returning for a short time between 1549 and 1562.

History: Protestant
In 1563 the first Protestant abbot was appointed, and in 1565 a choir school was opened in the premises.

During the Thirty Years' War the monks returned again in 1630 and yet again in 1648, but were expelled; the choir school closed in 1630 and reopened in 1650. It was finally shut down in 1807.

A few years later in 1817 Blaubeuren became a Protestant seminary with an attached boarding school, which has remained to the present, except for a closure during World War II.

The school now operates in co-operation with the similar establishment at Maulbronn Abbey: see Evangelical Seminaries of Maulbronn and Blaubeuren.

References

Further reading
 Carl Baur: Das Kloster zu Blaubeuren. Ein Führer, Kunstfreunden und Fremden gewidmet von Carl Baur, Blaubeuren 1877.
 Hermann Dilger: Kloster, Klosterschule und Seminar. In: Blaubeuren 700 Jahre Stadt. Blaubeuren 1967.
 Otto-Günter Lonhard: 900 Jahre Kloster Blaubeuren. Kritische Überlegungen zur Gründungsgeschichte (1180-1125). In: Zeitschrift für Württembergische Landesgeschichte 46 (1987), pp. 368–377.
 Gerhard Dopffel (ed.): Kloster Blaubeuren – 900 Jahre. Theiss, Stuttgart 1985, 
 Immo Eberl (ed.): Kloster Blaubeuren. 1085–1985. Benediktinisches Erbe und evangelische Seminartradition. Exhibition catalogue. Thorbecke, Sigmaringen 1985, 
 Otto-Günter Lonhard: Das Kloster Blaubeuren im Mittelalter. Rechts- u. Wirtschaftsgeschichte einer schwäbischen Benediktinerabtei (= Veröffentlichungen der Kommission für Geschichtliche Landeskunde in Baden-Württemberg. Bd. 25). Kohlhammer, Stuttgart 1963.
 Rainer Kahsnitz: Blaubeuren, ehemalige Abteikirche St. Johannes der Täufer, Hochaltar. In: The same: Die großen Schnitzaltäre. Spätgotik in Süddeutschland, Österreich, Südtirol with photographs by Achim Bunz. Verlag Neue Zürcher Zeitung, Zürich 2005,  (online (PDF, 3.1 MB)
 Anna Moraht-Fromm and Wolfgang Schürle (eds.): Kloster Blaubeuren. Der Chor und sein Hochaltar. Theiss, Stuttgart 2002.
 Christian Kayser: Mönchszellen, Spitztonnen, Formziegel – Untersuchungen am Dormentbau und Kapitelsaal des ehemaligen Klosters Blaubeuren. In: Denkmalpflege in Baden-Württemberg, 44. Jahrgang 2014, Heft 1, pp. 33–38. (PDF; 5.4 MB).
 Christian Kayser: Das ehemalige Benediktinerkloster Blaubeuren. Bauforschung an einer Klosteranlage des Spätmittelalters (= Forschungen und Berichte der Bau- und Kunstdenkmalpflege in Baden-Württemberg. Bd. 17). Thorbecke, Ostfildern 2020,

External links

Monasteries in Baden-Württemberg
Benedictine monasteries in Germany
Schools in Baden-Württemberg
1080s establishments in the Holy Roman Empire
1085 establishments in Europe
1807 disestablishments in Germany
Christian monasteries established in the 11th century
Buildings and structures in Alb-Donau-Kreis